Psychostrophia endoi is a moth in the family Epicopeiidae. It was described by Inoue in 1992. It is found in Laos.

The length of the forewings is about 16 mm. The forewings have an entirely black or blackish discal cell and no light submarginal spots.

References

Moths described in 1992
Epicopeiidae